Samuel Wilder may refer to:

 Billy Wilder (1906–2002), filmmaker whose birth name was Samuel Wilder
Sam Wilder (American football) (born 1933), American football player
Sam Wilder (Charmed), fictional character from the American TV series Charmed
 Samuel Gardner Wilder (1831–1888), shipping magnate in Hawaii